Mwamba Rugby Football Club, (Known as Stanbic Mwamba RFC for sponsorship purposes), is a Kenyan rugby union club based in Nairobi. The club was founded in 1977 with the aim of promoting rugby union among indigenous Kenyans at a time when the sport of rugby was still de facto a preserve of  whites in Kenya.

The word “Mwamba” is Swahili for “rock" or "boulder”, which signifies stability in performances in the local leagues, firmness in the desire to nurture local talent, and consistency in the tenacious commitment to keeping alive the dreams of its founders.

Since formation the club has played at the Nairobi Railway Club next to Uhuru Park. Mwamba RFC competes in the Kenya Cup, the highest-level rugby competition in Kenya.

Notable players 
Edward Rombo
Collins Injera
Humphrey Kayange
Dennis Ombachi

References 

https://www.nation.co.ke/sports/rugby/Mwamba-get-millions-from-Stanbic-deal-KCB-lie-in-wait/1106-5037104-4rorj7z/index.html

External links 

Kenyan rugby union teams
Sport in Nairobi
Rugby clubs established in 1977
1977 establishments in Kenya